Vivien Twidwell (June 26, 1908 – March 27, 1981) was an American politician who served as a member of the Washington House of Representatives from 1957 to 1961.  She represented Washington's 21st legislative district as a Democrat.

References

1908 births
1981 deaths
Democratic Party members of the Washington House of Representatives
Women state legislators in Washington (state)